Sympistis acheron is a moth of the family Noctuidae first described by James T. Troubridge in 2008.

Adults are on wing from late July to late September.

References

acheron
Moths of North America
Fauna of California
Moths described in 2008